Osterholz-Scharmbeck (Northern Low Saxon: Oosterholt-Scharmbeek) is a town and the capital of the district of Osterholz, in Lower Saxony, Germany. Osterholz-Scharmbeck is situated in between the cities  of Bremen and Bremerhaven.

Geography

Neighbouring places 
 Bremen (22 km)
 Delmenhorst (31 km)
 Achim (37 km)
 Bremerhaven (39 km)
 Brake (40 km)
 Zeven (41 km)
 Bremervörde (43 km)
 Nordenham (46 km)
 Oldenburg (48 km)
 Rotenburg (50 km)

Division of the town

Official parts 

 Freißenbüttel
 Garlstedt
 Heilshorn
 Hülseberg
 Ohlenstedt
 Pennigbüttel
 Sandhausen
 Scharmbeckstotel
 Teufelsmoor

Historical parts 

 Ahrensfelde
 Altenbrück
 Altendamm
 Auf Dem Raden
 Auf Dem Rusch
 Bargten
 Bredbeck
 Buschhausen
 Büttel
 Feldhof
 Haslah
 Hinter Dem Horn
 Kattenhorn
 Lange Heide
 Lintel
 Muskau
 Myhle
 Niedersandhausen
 Ovelgönne
 Ruschkamp
 Settenbeck
 Vorwohlde
 Westerbeck
 Wiste

History 
The town was first mentioned in 1043 as Scirnbeci. From 1180 on the Scharmbeck belonged to the Prince-Archbishopric of Bremen. The monastery in Osterholz was founded in 1182 and persisted until 1650, when Lower Saxony became mostly Protestant. In 1648 the Prince-Archbishopric was transformed into the Duchy of Bremen, which was first ruled in personal union by the Swedish and from 1715 on by the Hanoverian Crown. In 1823 the Duchy was abolished and its territory became part of the Stade Region in the Kingdom of Hanover.

In 1927 the two communities of Osterholz and Scharmbeck were merged under the name of Osterholz-Scharmbeck and in 1929 town privileges were granted.

Between 1978 and 1992, 4,200 soldiers of the U.S. Army's 2nd Armored Division (Forward) were stationed, and another 4,000 family members resided in Osterholz-Scharmbeck.

Population Growth 
 1904: 4.701 
 1909: 6.060 
 1945: 12.500 
 1961: 19.258 
 1987: 24.150 
 2004: 31.145 
 2005: 31.055 
 2010: 30.218

Mayor 
The mayor is Torsten Rohde (independent). He was elected in May 2014 with 59,02 % of the votes.   The predecessor was Martin Wagener (SPD).

Notable people 
 Roland Baar (born 1965), rowing sportsman
 Eduard Neumann (1903–1985), professor and rector of the Free University of Berlin
 Bodo Ramelow (born 1956), politician (The Left), since 2014 Minister President of Thuringia
 Jimmy Fallon's paternal grandmother, Luise Schalla was from here

Books 
 Friedrich Kühlken: Zwischen Niederweser und Niederelbe – Eine Heimatkunde des Landes Bremen und des Niedersächsischen Regierungsbezirks Stade. Osterholz-Scharmbeck 1950.
 Reelf Menckhoff: Chronik von Osterholz-Scharmbeck – Band 1: Von den Anfängen bis 1929. Stadt Osterholz-Scharmbeck 2004.
 Jürgen Meyer-Korte, Rolf Metzing: Osterholz-Scharmbeck: Picture and Development of a City. Saade, Osterholz-Scharmbeck 1979.
 Johann Segelken: Osterholz-Scharmbecker Heimatbuch. Saade, Osterholz-Scharmbeck 1987, .
 Ernstheinrich Meyer-Stiens: Heimliche Hauptstraße, die Bahnhofstraße in Osterholz-Scharmbeck 1865 – 1929 – 1945 – 1999. Menschen, Ereignisse und Innenansichten einer norddeutschen Kleinstadt. Saade, Osterholz-Scharmbeck 2000, .

References

External links 
  
 Official site of village Freißenbüttel 

Towns in Lower Saxony
Osterholz